Tracey Andersson (born 5 December 1984 in Trelleborg) is a Swedish hammer thrower.

Her personal best in the event is 70.82 metres achieved in March 2013 in Castellón. This is the current national record.

Achievements

See also 
Tracy Anderson, an American fitness entrepreneur

References

1984 births
People from Trelleborg
Living people
Swedish female hammer throwers
World Athletics Championships athletes for Sweden
Swedish Athletics Championships winners
Sportspeople from Skåne County